Marlon Palmer (born September 28, 1980) is an American former professional basketball player.

Career
2008-09: Colorado 14ers (NBA D-League) 15.0 ppg, 6.0 apg, 2.0 spg
2007: BC Kalev/Cramo (Est-KML) (9 games): 12.6ppg, 2.7apg, 4.2rpg 0.8spg
2007: Guaros De Lara (Ven-LPB) (3 games): 23.5ppg, 8.7apg, 4.2rpg, 2.5spg
2006-2007: Qatar Club (QAT-D1, 1T) (21 games): 28.3 ppg, 8.7 apg, 2.5spg,
2005: Rockford Lightning (CBA, 1T); (44 games): *20.9ppg, 7.3apg, 4.4ppg, 1.5spg,
2005: Minnesota Timberwolves (NBA); released in October *2005
2005: (July) Southern California Summer Pro League; (Miami Heat)
2005: Chicago Bulls (NBA) minicamp
2004-2005: Yakima Sun Kings (CBA, 1T) (12 games): *20.5ppg, 4.0apg, 3.6rpg, 1.56spg
2004: Southern California Summer Pro League (Golden State Warriors)
2004: Florence Flyers (USBL, 1T) (24 games): 18.8ppg, 8.1apg, 4.2rpg, 1.8spg
2003: Drafted by Sioux Fall Skyforce (NDA D-League)
2003: Southern California Summer Pro League (Golden State Warriors)
2003: Portsmouth Pre-NBA Draft Invitational Tournament
2002-2003: Kentucky Wesleyan (NCAA-II)
2001-2002: New Mexico (NCAA) 12.8ppg, 5.4apg, 5.4rpg
2000-2001: New Mexico (NCAA): 11.4ppg, 5.3apg, 4.1rpg
1999-2000: New Mexico (NCAA)
1995-1999: Los Angeles, CA/Verbum Dei High School: 28ppg, 9apg

Awards and achievements
2007: Qatar Player of the Year
2007: Qatar Emir Cup Winner
2006: Asia-Basket.com Asian Club Championships 1st Team
2006: Asia-Basket.com Asian Club Championships Best Guard
2006: All CBA 1st Team
2005, 2006: CBA All-Star Game
2003: NCAA-II Player of the Year
2003: Six-time player of the week (four consecutive) NCAA-II
1999: John Wooden High School Player of the Year Award

Notes
All stats provided by:
www.nba.com
www.euro-basket.com
www.asia-basket.com
www.kwc.edu
www.golobos.com

References

1980 births
Living people
American expatriate basketball people in Estonia
American expatriate basketball people in Qatar
American expatriate basketball people in Venezuela
BC Kalev/Cramo players
Colorado 14ers players
CBA All-Star Game players
Kentucky Wesleyan Panthers men's basketball players
New Mexico Lobos men's basketball players
Rockford Lightning players
Yakima Sun Kings players
American men's basketball players